Alberto Jurado (24 May 1902 – 10 August 1984) was an Ecuadorian sprinter and long jumper. He competed in the men's 100 metres and the long jump events at the 1924 Summer Olympics.

References

External links
 

1902 births
1984 deaths
Ecuadorian male sprinters
Ecuadorian male long jumpers
Olympic athletes of Ecuador
Athletes (track and field) at the 1924 Summer Olympics